Ray Norman (1889–1971) was an Australian rugby league footballer and coach. A New South Wales state and Australia national representative, his club career was played with Annandale, the South Sydney and the Eastern Suburbs clubs in the NSWRFL.

Playing career
After playing rugby union for Annadale and Glebe, Norman switched to rugby league in 1910

He was one of four brothers, along with Bernard, Roy and Rex Norman, who played in the NSW Rugby Football League first-grade competition. Both Rex and Ray represented the Australia national rugby league team, becoming only the second set of brothers to do so behind Viv and Bill Farnsworth. Ray was first selected for Australia in 1914 and after the war he toured New Zealand in 1919. He retired from playing in 1921, and immediately joined the coaching ranks at Eastern Suburbs.

Coaching career
After retiring as a player, Norman coached the Eastern Suburbs which included a premiership in 1923. He later coached the Manly-Warringah Sea Eagles for one year, in 1954, and the NSW Country representative side.

Death

The Sydney Morning Herald said of Norman:  "He was one of Rugby League's greatest tacticians".
His funeral was held at St. Peter's Church, Watsons Bay, New South Wales on 3 May 1971 and later at Northern Suburbs Crematorium.

References

External links
* 

1889 births
1971 deaths
Annandale rugby league players
Australia national rugby league team players
Australian rugby league coaches
Australian rugby league players
Country New South Wales rugby league team coaches
Manly Warringah Sea Eagles coaches
New South Wales rugby league team players
Rugby league five-eighths
Rugby league players from Sydney
South Sydney Rabbitohs players
Sydney Roosters coaches
Sydney Roosters captains
Sydney Roosters players
South Sydney Rabbitohs captains